The 2022–23 Liga Națională season is the 73rd season of the Liga Națională, the highest professional basketball league in Romania. This will be the season with 18 teams divided into two conferences, placed by the previous regular season's standing. 

U-BT Cluj-Napoca are the defending champions.

Teams

Conference 1

Conference 2

Romanian clubs in European competitions

References 

2022–23
Romanian
Lea